Luftflotte 3 (Air Fleet 3) was one of the primary divisions of the German Luftwaffe in World War II.  It was formed on 1 February 1939 from Luftwaffengruppenkommando 3 in Munich and redesignated Luftwaffenkommando West (Air Command West) on 26 September 1944. This Luftwaffe detachment was based in German-occupied areas of Northern France, the Netherlands, Belgium, and Vichy France, to support the Axis power's forces in area. Its command offices were in Paris, France (on 26 June 1944).

Strategic Reconnaissance
Stab/FAGr.123 (Toussus le Noble – Buc)
4.(F)/123 (Saint-André-de-l'Eure)
5.(F)/123 (Monchy-Breton)
1.(F)/121 (Toussus le Noble – Buc)

II.Fliegerkorps (II.Air Corps) Chartres

Fliegerführer West (Flight Director in West Area/Land Air Attack)

Tactical Reconnaissance
Stab/NAGr.13 (Chartres)
1./NAGr.13 (Chartres)
3./NAGr.13 (Laval)

Land Air Attack
III./SG 4 (Clermont-Ferrand)
III./SG 4 (Detach) (Avord)

IX. Fliegerkorps (IX.Air Corps) Beauvais-Lille

Strategic Reconnaissance
3.(F)/122 (Soesterberg)
6.(F)/123 (Cormeilles)

Bombers(Medium)
Stab/KG 2 (Gilze en Rijen)
I./KG 2 (Gilze en Rijen)
II./KG 2 (Gilze en Rijen)
III./KG 2 (Hesepe)
Stab/KG 6 (Melun-Villaroche)
I./KG 6 (Melun-Villaroche)
II./KG 6 (Melun-Villaroche)
III./KG 6 (Melun-Villaroche)
16./KG 6(JABO/Rapid) (Soesterberg)
Stab/KG 30 (Zwischenhan)
I./KG 30 (Leck)
4./KG 51 (JABO/Rapid) (Soesterberg)
5./KG 51(JABO/Rapid) (Gilze en Rijen)
6./KG 51(JABO/Rapid) (Soesterberg)
Stab/KG 54 (Eindhoven)
I./KG 54 (Eindhoven)
III./KG 54 (Eindhoven)
III./KG 66 (Montdidier)
(Eins)St. IV./KG 101 (Saint-Dizier)
Stab(KG)/LG 1 (Melsbroek)
I.(KG)/LG 1 (Le Culot)
II.(KG)/LG 1(Melsbroek)

JABO (Fighter-Bombers/Incursion strike groups)
I.(Jb)/SKG 10 (Tours)

X.Fliegerkorps (X.Air Corps) Angers

Special duties/long-distance operations
1./KG 200 (Mont-de-Marsan)
1./KG 200(Detach) (Bordeaux–Mérignac)
II/KG 200 (Biscarrosse)

Strategic/Maritime Reconnaissance (Ultra Long Range)
Stab/FAGr.5 (Mont-de-Marsan)
1.(F)/5 (Mont-de-Marsan)
2.(F)/5 (Mont-de-Marsan)
4.(F)/5 (Nantes)
3.(F)/123 (Corme-Écluse)
1.(F)/SAGr.129 (Biscarrosse)
1.(F)/JG.52 "BF 109"

Bombers (Heavy) Submarine Support/Merchant Strike (Long Range)
Stab/KG 40 (Bordeaux–Mérignac)
1./KG 40 (Toulouse–Blagnac)
2./KG 40 (Bordeaux–Mérignac)
II./KG 40 (Bordeaux–Mérignac)
7./KG 40 (Saint-Jean-d'Angély)
8./KG 40 (Cognac)
9./KG 40 (Cognac)

2.Fliegerdivision (2.Air Division) Montfrin

Strategic/Tactical/Maritime Reconnaissance (Medium-Short Range)
1.(F)/33 (St.Martin)
2./NAGr.13 (Cuers)
2./SAGr.128 (Berre)

Bombers (Medium)
Stab/KG 26 (Montpellier)
II./KG 26 (LT) (Valence)
III./KG 26 (LT) (Montpellier)
III./KG 26 (LT)(Detach) (Valence)
Stab/KG 77 (Salon-de-Provence)
I./KG 77 (LT) (Orange-Caritat)
III./KG 77 (LT) (Orange-Caritat)
6./KG 77 (Istres)
4./KG 76 (Istres)
6./KG 76 (Istres)
Stab/KG 100 (Toulouse–Francazal)
III./KG 100 (Toulouse–Francazal)

II.Jagdkorps (II.Fighter Corps) Chantilly

4.Jagddivision (4°Fighter Division) Metz

Jagdabschnittführer 4 (Fighter Direction 4°) St Pol-Brias

Fighters
Stab/JG 1 (St.Quentin–Clastres)
I./JG 3 (St.Quentin–Clastres)
I./JG 5 (St.Quentin–Clastres)
II./JG 11 (Mons en Chaussée)
I./JG 301 (Épinoy)
Stab/JG 27 (Champfleury)
I./JG 27 (Vertus)
III./JG 27 (Connantre)
IV./JG 27 (Champfleury)

Night Fighters
Stab/NJG 4 (Chenay)
I./NJG 4 (Florennes)
III./NJG 4 (Junvincourt)
Stab/NJG 5 (Haguenau)
I./NJG 5 (Saint-Dizier)
III./NJG 5 (Athies-sous-Laon)

5.Jagddivision (5° Fighter Division) Jouy-en-Josas

Jagdabschnittführer 5 (Fighter Director 5) Bernay

Fighters
Stab/JG 2 (Creil)
I./JG 2 (Creil)
II./JG 2 (Creil)
III./JG 2 (Creil)
Stab/JG 3 (Évreux)
II./JG 3 (Guyancourt)
III./JG 3 (Mareilly)
Stab/JG 11 (Le Mans)
I./JG 11 (Le Mans)
I0./JG 11 (Le Mans)
I./JG 1 (Alençon)
II./JG 1 (Alençon)
Stab/JG 26 (Guyancourt)
I./JG 26 (Guyancourt)
II./JG 26 (Guyancourt)

Night Fighters
Stab/NJG 2 (Coulommiers)
I./NJG 2 (Châteaudun)
II./NJG 2 (Coulommiers)
II./NJG 4 (Coulommiers)

Jagdabschnittführer Bretagne (Fighter Direction in Brittany) Brest

Fighters
II./JG 53 (Vannes)

Jagdabschnittführer Südfrankreich (Southern France Fighter Direction) Aix

Fighters
1./JGr 200 (Orange-Caritat)
2./JGr 200 (Avignon)
3./JGr 200 (Orange-Caritat)

Jagdlehrer-Gr Bordeaux (Instruction Wing in Bordeaux sector)

Jagdabschnittführer Bordeaux (Fighter Direction in Bordeaux) Bordeaux-Mérignac
Zerstörer (Heavy Fighters)
Stab/ZG 1 (Bordeaux–Mérignac)
1./ZG 1 (Corme-Écluse)
3./ZG 1 (Corme-Écluse)
2./ZG 1 (Châteauroux)
III./ZG 1 (Cazaux)

Luftwaffe Special Strike Units

Jet Bombers/Jet Fighter-Bombers
(R)"Blitz" KG 76 (Istres)
II.St.(JABO)/KG 51 (Soesterberg)
Mistel Special Section
2. (Mistel I) /KG 101 (Saint-Dizier)
II. (Mistel I) -(Detach)/KG 200 (Saint-Dizier)
Bombers with V-1 Launchers
Stab/KG 3 (Venlo)
II./KG 3 (also known as I./KG.5) (Venlo)
I./KG 53 "Legion Condor" (Gilze en Rijen)
III./KG 53 "Legion Condor" (Gilze en Rijen)
Luftwaffe V-1 fixed/mobile ramps units; operated near Calais (France), and in Belgium and the Netherlands.
Untergruppenbezeichnung FZG (Flakzielgerät) 76 (also known as 5.Flak Division (W), later as Armeekorps zur Vergeltung)
I./155 Artillerie Abt (W)
II./155 Artillerie-Abt (W)
III./155 Artillerie-Abt (W)
Luftwaffe special transport units(1944–45);  based in Muhldorf, Bavaria, and composed of Helicopters:
Focke-Achgelis Fa 223 Drachen
Flettner Fl 265
Flettner 282B Kolibri
Heer/Luftwaffe V-2 mobile ramps sections
Division zur Vergeltung(Div.z.V.); led by Heer and SS Commanders, working along with Luftwaffe personnel and facilities. They operated in France, Belgium and the Netherlands.
"Div.z.V." Nordgruppe
444° Artillerie-Abt
485° Artillerie- Abt (also known as Artillerie Regiment z. V. 902)
2°./485° Artillerie-Abt
"Div.z.V." Südgruppe
500° Waffen SS Artillerie-Abt (also known as 500° SS Werfer Abt.)
836° Artillerie-Abt (also known as Artillerie Regiment zur Vergeltung 901)
Heer V-4 "Rheinbote" Mobile ramps units
I./709 Artillerie Abt
Heer V-3 Artillery group
705° Artillerie Abt.

Abbreviations
FAGr = Fernaufklärungsgruppe = Long-range/strategic Reconnaissance aircraft.
Gruppe = equivalent to a USAAF Group.
JG = Jagdgeschwader = Fighters.
Geschwader = equivalent to a USAAF Wing.
JGr = Jagdgruppe = Fighters.
KG = Kampfgeschwader = Bombers.
LG = Lehrgeschwader = Operational Training.
NAGr = Nahaufklärungsgruppe = Short-range/tactical Observation aircraft.
NJG = Nachtjagdgeschwader = Night Fighters
SAGr = Seeaufklärungsgruppe = Maritime Patrol aircraft
SKG = Schnellkampfgeschwader = Fast Bombers.
St = Staffel = equivalent to a RAF Squadron.
ZG = Zerstörergeschwader = Twin engined diurnal heavy fighters.

Commanding officers

Generalfeldmarschall Hugo Sperrle, 1 February 1939 – 23 August 1944
Generaloberst Otto Deßloch, 23 August 1944 – 22 September 1944
Generalleutnant Alexander Holle, 22 September 1944 – 26 September 1944
redesignated to Luftwaffenkommando West
 Generalleutnant Alexander Holle, 28 September 1944 – 15 November 1944
 Generalleutnant Joseph Schmid, 16 November 1944 – 27 April 1945
 Generalleutnant Martin Harlinghausen, 28 April 1945 – 8 May 1945

Chief of staff
Generalmajor Maximilian Ritter von Pohl, 1 February 1939 – 10 June 1940
Oberst Günther Korten, 11 June 1940 – 31 December 1940
Generalmajor Karl Koller, 1 January 1941 – 23 August 1943
Generalleutnant Hermann Plocher, 1 October 1943 – 26 September 1944
redesignated to Luftwaffenkommando West
 Oberst Hans Wolters, September 1944 – March 1945
 Oberst Heinrich Wittmer, March 1945 – May 1945

Subordinated units

References
Notes

References
 Luftflotte 3 @ Lexikon der Wehrmacht
 Luftflotte 3 @ The Luftwaffe, 1933-45

German Air Fleets in World War II
Military units and formations established in 1939
Military units and formations disestablished in 1945